University of Engineering & Management (UEM) is a private university located in Jaipur, Rajasthan, India. It was established in the year 2011 by Ordinance 11 of 2011 and Act No 5 of 2012 of Govt of Rajasthan.

Academics

Academic programmes 
The university offers undergraduate, post-graduates. The undergraduate courses offer B.Tech in engineering fields including Computer Science and Engineering (CSE), Electronics & Communication Engineering (ECE), Electrical & Electronics Engineering (EEE), Electrical Engineering, Biotechnology, Civil Engineering, and Mechanical Engineering. while the postgraduate courses offer M.Tech.

Apart from these, the university offers Bachelor of Computer Applications (BCA) degree course in the field of Computer Science. The institute also offers Bachelor of Business Administration (BBA) and Master in Business Administration (MBA) degree courses for the management students at the undergraduate and postgraduate level respectively. The University also offers Bachelor of Physiotherapy (BPT) degree course in the field of Physiotherapy.

Recognition
The university is recognized by the University Grants Commission (UGC) of India and has the right to confer degrees as per the section 22 of the UGC Act (1956) and as per UGC nomenclature of the degrees.

Collaboration & Partner colleges 
The university has a strong collaboration with the following 2 engineering colleges of IEM-UEM Group in areas of student exchange, faculty exchange, joint research, curriculum development for students.
 University of Engineering & Management, Kolkata
 Institute of Engineering and Management (IEM)
Apart from this, the university has an affiliation with many foreign universities and colleges for student exchange programs.

Research 

The university has a research and development cell which encourages students for research works related to various fields of engineering. It also helps students to publish their research papers on different national and international level conferences.

Student life

Sports facility 
The UEM campus at Jaipur has all sorts of sports facilities like Cricket, Football, Basketball, Volleyball, Tennis courts separate for boys and girls and also indoor games facilities like Table Tennis.
Annual Sports Fest is held at the campus.

=== Wi-Fi Campus ===
The university has Wi-Fi enabled hostels for easy access to the internet. Besides the own Wi-Fi connectivity of the university, Vodafone provides Wi-Fi facility inside the campus for free of cost. All the computers of computer laboratories and library are connected to the internet via a high-speed LAN connection.

Extracurricular 
Annual Technical Festivals, Cultural Festivals, Sports Festivals are held.
Robotics Workshops, are held twice a year. Apart from these, there are regular Coding Workshops, Workshops on Ethical Hacking, Web Programming etc.

Annual Optronix Conference is held at the campus where professors of international repute from Japan, USA, Canada, London come in. Students are exposed to international teaching right from Day-1.

The SPIE, USA - India Chapter is led by the students of University of Engineering & Management, and they travel to USA every year funded by SPIE and OSA (Optical Society of America).
The university also has student chapters on SPIE and The Optical Society of America (OSA).

Community Development and Social Service - Teaching Street Children, Cultural activities at Oldage homes, Plantation Programs etc. are regular features of the University of Engineering & Management (UEM).

References

Engineering colleges in Jaipur
Universities and colleges in Jaipur
Engineering universities and colleges in India
Private universities in India
Private engineering colleges in India
Educational institutions established in 2011
2011 establishments in Punjab, India
Business schools in Rajasthan
UEM, Jaipur
Universities in Rajasthan